Prijevor (Serbian Cyrillic: Пријевор) is a village in the municipality of Budva, Montenegro.

Demographics
According to the 2011 census, its population was 713.

References

Populated places in Budva Municipality
Serb communities in Montenegro